James Edward Fordham (December 6, 1916 – April 15, 1969) was an American football player. He played college football for the Georgia Bulldogs football team from 1937 to 1939 and professional football in the National Football League (NFL) for the Chicago Bears from 1944 to 1945. In 1944, he ranked among the NFL league leaders with 381 rushing yards (ninth), 5.2 rushing yards per attempt (fifth) and 38.1 rushing yards per game (tenth).

References

1916 births
1969 deaths
American football fullbacks
Chicago Bears players
Georgia Bulldogs football players
People from Emanuel County, Georgia
Players of American football from Georgia (U.S. state)